Christopher, Duke of Brunswick-Lüneburg-Harburg, also known as Christoph or Christoffel (21 August 1570 in Harburg – 7 July 1606 in Harburg) was Duke of Brunswick-Lüneburg-Harburg.

Life 
Christopher was a son of Duke Otto II of Brunswick-Harburg (1528-1603) from his second marriage with Hedwig (1535-1616), daughter of Count Enno II of East Frisia. His motto was Consilio et armis ("By counsel and weapons").

After his father's death, he took over the government of Harburg jointly with his brother William Augustus. In January 1604, the town of Harburg paid homage to the brothers.

On 28 October 1604 in Harburg, Christopher married Elisabeth (1567-1618), the daughter of Duke Julius of Brunswick-Wolfenbüttel and widow of Count Adolf XI of Schaumburg. The marriage remained childless.

Christopher died two years later, in 1606, after a fall in Harburg Castle. As the eldest brother, John Frederick (1557-1619) had waived his right to govern, the youngest brother Otto III, took Christopher's position as co-ruler.

Ancestors

References 
 August B. Michaelis and Julius Wilhelm Hamberger: Einleitung zu einer volständigen Geschichte der Chur- und Fürstlichen Häuser in Teutschland, Meyer, 1759, vol. 1, p. 120 ff
 Vaterländisches Archiv für hannoverisch-braunschweigische Geschichte, Herold & Wahlstab, 1835, p. 400 ff, Online

Footnotes 

Dukes of Brunswick-Lüneburg
1570 births
1606 deaths
Middle House of Lüneburg